Still Bill can refer to the following:

 Still Bill, 1972 studio album by American soul musician Bill Withers
 Still Bill (film), a 2009 documentary film about musician Bill Withers
 "Still Bill", the nickname of the statue, William the Silent, at Rutgers University in New Brunswick, New Jersey